James McCormick (26 September 1912 – 4 January 1968) was an English professional footballer and manager.

McCormick began his career with Rotherham United having been spotted playing for the local YMCA. Despite interest from other clubs, he moved to Chesterfield in 1932 and just eight months later he signed for Tottenham Hotspur.

After revitalising the side's 1933/34 promotion push, McCormick became a mainstay of the side that finish 3rd in the 1933/34 First Division and remained a constant figure until a serious injury suffered at the start of the 1937/38 season virtually finished his career.

After guesting for more than a dozen clubs during the Second World War, McCormick joined Fulham in 1946 but injuries restricted him to just nine appearances in two years and he moved to Lincoln City in 1947. He spent just three months with Crystal Palace in 1949.

Managerial statistics

References

1912 births
1968 deaths
Footballers from Rotherham
English footballers
Association football wingers
Rotherham United F.C. players
Scarborough F.C. players
Chesterfield F.C. players
Tottenham Hotspur F.C. players
Fulham F.C. players
Lincoln City F.C. players
Crystal Palace F.C. players
Sliema Wanderers F.C. players
English Football League players
English football managers
Turkey national football team managers
York City F.C. managers
English Football League managers
Sheffield United F.C. non-playing staff
English expatriate football managers
Expatriate football managers in Turkey
English expatriate sportspeople in Turkey
Chelmsford City F.C. wartime guest players